Keevan Raj (born 14 October 1979) is a Malaysian former field hockey player. He competed in the men's tournament at the 2000 Summer Olympics.

References

External links

1979 births
Living people
Malaysian male field hockey players
Olympic field hockey players of Malaysia
Field hockey players at the 2000 Summer Olympics
Place of birth missing (living people)
Malaysian people of Tamil descent
Malaysian sportspeople of Indian descent
Commonwealth Games medallists in field hockey
Commonwealth Games silver medallists for Malaysia
Field hockey players at the 1998 Commonwealth Games
Field hockey players at the 2006 Commonwealth Games
Asian Games medalists in field hockey
Asian Games bronze medalists for Malaysia
Field hockey players at the 2002 Asian Games
Medalists at the 2002 Asian Games
1998 Men's Hockey World Cup players
Medallists at the 2006 Commonwealth Games